Konstantinovo is the name of several  rural localities in Russia.

Arkhangelsk Oblast
As of 2010, one rural locality in Arkhangelsk Oblast bears this name:
Konstantinovo, Arkhangelsk Oblast, a village in Verkhneuftyugsky Selsoviet of Krasnoborsky District

Ivanovo Oblast
As of 2010, one rural locality in Ivanovo Oblast bears this name:
Konstantinovo, Ivanovo Oblast, a village in Ilyinsky District

Kaluga Oblast
As of 2010, one rural locality in Kaluga Oblast bears this name:
Konstantinovo, Kaluga Oblast, a village in Maloyaroslavetsky District

Kostroma Oblast
As of 2010, two rural localities in Kostroma Oblast bear this name:
Konstantinovo, Chukhlomsky District, Kostroma Oblast, a village in Sudayskoye Settlement of Chukhlomsky District
Konstantinovo, Kostromskoy District, Kostroma Oblast, a village in Kuzmishchenskoye Settlement of Kostromskoy District

Moscow Oblast
As of 2010, five rural localities in Moscow Oblast bear this name:
Konstantinovo, Domodedovo, Moscow Oblast, a selo under the administrative jurisdiction of Domodedovo Town Under Oblast Jurisdiction
Konstantinovo, Ramensky District, Moscow Oblast, a selo in Konstantinovskoye Rural Settlement of Ramensky District
Konstantinovo, Ruzsky District, Moscow Oblast, a village in Staroruzskoye Rural Settlement of Ruzsky District
Konstantinovo, Sergiyevo-Posadsky District, Moscow Oblast, a selo in Shemetovskoye Rural Settlement of Sergiyevo-Posadsky District
Konstantinovo, Voskresensky District, Moscow Oblast, a selo in Fedinskoye Rural Settlement of Voskresensky District

Ryazan Oblast

As of 2010, three rural localities in Ryazan Oblast bear this name:
Konstantinovo, Klepikovsky District, Ryazan Oblast, a selo in Davydovsky Rural Okrug of Klepikovsky District
Konstantinovo, Rybnovsky District, Ryazan Oblast, a selo in Kuzminsky Rural Okrug of Rybnovsky District
Konstantinovo, Shilovsky District, Ryazan Oblast, a selo in Pustopolsky Rural Okrug of Shilovsky District

Tver Oblast
As of 2010, seven rural localities in Tver Oblast bear this name:
Konstantinovo, Bezhetsky District, Tver Oblast, a selo in Shishkovskoye Rural Settlement of Bezhetsky District
Konstantinovo, Kashinsky District, Tver Oblast, a village in Pestrikovskoye Rural Settlement of Kashinsky District
Konstantinovo, Krasnovskoye Rural Settlement, Kimrsky District, Tver Oblast, a village in Krasnovskoye Rural Settlement of Kimrsky District
Konstantinovo, Krasnovskoye Rural Settlement, Kimrsky District, Tver Oblast, a village in Krasnovskoye Rural Settlement of Kimrsky District
Konstantinovo, Likhoslavlsky District, Tver Oblast, a village in Veskinskoye Rural Settlement of Likhoslavlsky District
Konstantinovo, Rameshkovsky District, Tver Oblast, a village in Nikolskoye Rural Settlement of Rameshkovsky District
Konstantinovo, Sonkovsky District, Tver Oblast, a village in Grigorkovskoye Rural Settlement of Sonkovsky District

Vladimir Oblast
As of 2010, two rural localities in Vladimir Oblast bear this name:
Konstantinovo, Gus-Khrustalny District, Vladimir Oblast, a village in Gus-Khrustalny District
Konstantinovo, Suzdalsky District, Vladimir Oblast, a selo in Suzdalsky District

Vologda Oblast
As of 2010, two rural localities in Vologda Oblast bear this name:
Konstantinovo, Gryazovetsky District, Vologda Oblast, a village in Lezhsky Selsoviet of Gryazovetsky District
Konstantinovo, Vologodsky District, Vologda Oblast, a village in Votchinsky Selsoviet of Vologodsky District

Yaroslavl Oblast
As of 2010, three rural localities in Yaroslavl Oblast bear this name:
Konstantinovo, Gavrilov-Yamsky District, Yaroslavl Oblast, a village in Stavotinsky Rural Okrug of Gavrilov-Yamsky District
Konstantinovo, Tutayevsky District, Yaroslavl Oblast, a village in Chebakovsky Rural Okrug of Tutayevsky District
Konstantinovo, Uglichsky District, Yaroslavl Oblast, a village in Vozdvizhensky Rural Okrug of Uglichsky District